This is a list of mayors of La Tour-de-Peilz. The executive of La Tour-de-Peilz is municipal council (Municipalité). It is presided by the mayor (syndic de La Tour-de-Peilz).

Tour-de-Peilz
 
Politics of the canton of Vaud
La Tour-de-Peilz